Hugh Quattlebaum (born June 26, 1978) is an American former baseball infielder who served as hitting coach for the New York Mets of Major League Baseball (MLB) in 2021.

Playing career
A native of Methuen, Massachusetts, Quattlebaum attended Amherst College. In 1999, he played collegiate summer baseball with the Bourne Braves of the Cape Cod Baseball League. Quattlebaum was selected by the Detroit Tigers in the 25th round of the 2000 MLB Draft.

Coaching career
On May 4, 2021, the Mets promoted Quattlebaum as the hitting coach replacing Chili Davis after the team had a .241 batting average through 22 games. After the season, Quattlebaum was reassigned along with Kevin Howard to the minor leagues.

References

External links
 
  Twitter
 LinkedIn

1978 births
Living people
People from Methuen, Massachusetts
Amherst College alumni
Bourne Braves players
Oneonta Tigers players
West Michigan Whitecaps players
Lakeland Tigers players
Ottawa Lynx players
Frederick Keys players
Major League Baseball hitting coaches
New York Mets coaches